Pinecrest Gardens is a  park in Pinecrest, Florida on the corner of Southwest 111th Street (Killian Drive) and Southwest 57th Avenue (Red Road).

It was the original location of the Parrot Jungle, a theme park started in 1936 until they relocated to the city of Miami's Watson Island in 2003. It was added to the National Register of Historic Places as the Parrot Jungle Historic District in 2011.

The park includes a variety of sites including a Botanical gardens, butterfly exhibit, swan lake, petting zoo, children's playground, and a popular splash-n-play area.  The park also hosts an annual fine arts festival, MagiCamp, and is available for rental for private parties, receptions, etc.

Gallery

External links

Aerial color photo from Google Maps

References

Botanical gardens in Florida
Tourist attractions in Miami-Dade County, Florida